Blepharoneura is a genus of fruit fly in the family Tephritidae. They are Neotropical in distribution, and only breed in Cucurbitaceae plants.

Species

Blepharoneura amazonensis Lima & Leite, 1952
Blepharoneura amplihyalina Norrbom & Condon, 2010
Blepharoneura apaapa Norrbom & Condon, 2010
Blepharoneura aspiculosa Norrbom & Condon, 2010
Blepharoneura atomaria (Fabricius, 1805)
Blepharoneura bidigitata Norrbom & Condon, 2010
Blepharoneura bipunctata Norrbom & Condon, 2010
Blepharoneura biseriata Wulp, 1899
Blepharoneura bivittata Norrbom & Condon, 2010
Blepharoneura brevivittata Norrbom & Condon, 2010
Blepharoneura chaconi Norrbom & Condon, 2010
Blepharoneura cornelli Norrbom & Condon, 2010
Blepharoneura cyclantherae Norrbom & Condon, 2010
Blepharoneura diva Giglio-Tos, 1893
Blepharoneura femoralis Wulp, 1899
Blepharoneura fernandezi Norrbom & Condon, 2010
Blepharoneura furcifer Hendel, 1914
Blepharoneura hirsuta Bates, 1933
Blepharoneura hyalinella Norrbom & Condon, 2010
Blepharoneura impunctata Hendel, 1914
Blepharoneura io Giglio-Tos, 1893
Blepharoneura isolata Norrbom & Condon, 2010
Blepharoneura longicauda Hendel, 1914
Blepharoneura lutea Norrbom & Condon, 2010
Blepharoneura macwilliamsae Norrbom & Condon, 2010
Blepharoneura manchesteri Condon & Norrbom, 1994
Blepharoneura marshalli Norrbom & Condon, 2010
Blepharoneura mexicana Norrbom & Condon, 2010
Blepharoneura mikenoltei Norrbom & Condon, 2010
Blepharoneura multipunctata Norrbom & Condon, 2010
Blepharoneura nigriapex Norrbom & Condon, 2010
Blepharoneura nigrifemur Norrbom & Condon, 2010
Blepharoneura nigripilosa Hering, 1935
Blepharoneura osmundsonae Norrbom & Condon, 2010
Blepharoneura parva Hendel, 1914
Blepharoneura perkinsi Condon & Norrbom, 1994
Blepharoneura poecilogastra (Loew, 1873)
Blepharoneura poecilosoma (Schiner, 1868)
Blepharoneura pulchella (Wulp, 1899)
Blepharoneura punctistigma Norrbom & Condon, 2010
Blepharoneura quadristriata Wulp, 1899
Blepharoneura quetzali Norrbom & Condon, 2010
Blepharoneura regina Giglio-Tos, 1893
Blepharoneura ruptafascia Norrbom & Condon, 2010
Blepharoneura rupta (Wulp, 1899)
Blepharoneura septemdigitata Norrbom & Condon, 2010
Blepharoneura sinepuncta Norrbom & Condon, 2010
Blepharoneura splendida Giglio-Tos, 1893
Blepharoneura tau Norrbom & Condon, 2010
Blepharoneura thetis Hendel, 1914
Blepharoneura unifasciata Norrbom & Condon, 2010
Blepharoneura variabilis Norrbom & Condon, 2010
Blepharoneura wasbaueri Norrbom & Condon, 2010
Blepharoneura zumbadoi Norrbom & Condon, 2010

References

Blepharoneurinae
Diptera of North America
Diptera of South America
Tephritidae genera
Taxa named by Hermann Loew